Jangi may refer to:

 Jangi (dance), a dance of Azerbaijan
 Vardablur, Aragatsotn, formerly known as Jangi, a town in Armenia
 Cəngi, a village in Azerbaijan

See also 
 Janggi, a board game popular in Korea
 Jhangi, a union council in the Khyber-Pakhtunkhwa province of Pakistan
 Jhangvi, a dialect spoken in Punjab, Pakistan
 Jangy Addy, Liberian athlete